Burlingame USD 454, also known as Burlingame Public Schools, is a public unified school district headquartered in Burlingame, Kansas, United States. The district serves Osage County.

History
Donald Blome, who had been the superintendent of USD 454, was hired as the superintendent of Garnett USD 365 in 2008.

Schools
The school district operates the following schools:
 Burlingame High School
 Burlingame Junior High School
 Burlingame Elementary School

See also
 Kansas State Department of Education
 Kansas State High School Activities Association
 List of high schools in Kansas
 List of unified school districts in Kansas

References

External links
 

School districts in Kansas
Education in Osage County, Kansas